Jacob Hasbrouck De Witt (October 2, 1784 – January 30, 1857) was a U.S. Representative from New York.

Early life
Born in Marbletown, New York, De Witt was raised in Twaalskill (now part of the city of Kingston).  His father was Colonel Thomas De Witt (1741-1809), a veteran of the American Revolution. His mother, Elsie Hasbrouck DeWitt (1749-1832), was the daughter of Jacob and Maria (Hornbeck) Hasbrouck, making her a member of the Hasbrouck family and a relative of many early notable Ulster County politicians. His parents had married February 28, 1782.

His aunt Mary De Witt was the first wife of General James Clinton, and was the mother of DeWitt Clinton, making him Jacob's first cousin.  Jacob De Witt attended the rural schools of Twaalskill and the Kingston (New York) Academy, afterwards becoming a farmer. His grandfather, Egbert A. DeWitt, was town supervisor of Rochester, Ulster County, New York from 1736 to 1738.

He served as the adjutant of a militia regiment in the War of 1812.  He continued his militia service, and later attained the rank of Colonel as commander of the New York Militia's 131st Regiment.

Political career and death
De Witt was elected as a Democratic-Republican to the Sixteenth Congress (March 4, 1819 – March 3, 1821).  He was not a candidate for renomination in 1820, and returned to farming.

In 1827 and 1840 De Witt was Kingston's Town Supervisor and a member of the Ulster County Board of Supervisors.  He was a member of the New York State Assembly in 1839 and 1847.

De Witt died in Kingston on January 30, 1857.  He was originally buried at Sharpe Cemetery on Albany Avenue, and later reinterred at Kinsgton's Old Dutch Churchyard.

Personal life
Jacob married Mary Ann Meyer (1797-1816) on February 20, 1815. She died just a year later.

On June 8, 1823 he married Sarah Ann Sleight, daughter of Johannes and Aaltje (Swartwout) Sleight and a granddaughter of Jacobus Swartwout.  They had at least four children:
Elsie De Witt (1823-1900); died unmarried.
Mary De Witt (1825-1893); married Kingston banker James Sidney Evans (1816-1857) in 1850
Thomas Grier Evans (1852-1905); wrote the genealogical book "de Witt Family of Ulster County, New York" in 1886; was a Yale graduate and lawyer
Anna De Witt (1834-1901); married Charles Lytle Lamberton (1829-1906), who was a Pennsylvania State Senator from 1862 to 1864
John Sleight De Witt (1838-1901)

DeWitt Street in Kingston, New York was named for Jacob and his unmarried brother, Reuben DeWitt (1787-1859).

References

Jacob H. De Witt in History of Ulster County, New York by Nathaniel Bartlett Sylvester
Jacob H. De Witt, list of Kingston Town Supervisors in Proceedings of the Ulster County Legislature
Jacob H. Dewitt, commander of the 131st Regiment in Annual Report of the New York State Historian

1784 births
1857 deaths
People from Marbletown, New York
Politicians from Kingston, New York
American militiamen in the War of 1812
Town supervisors in New York (state)
Members of the New York State Assembly
Democratic-Republican Party members of the United States House of Representatives from New York (state)
Burials in New York (state)
19th-century American politicians
American militia officers
De Witt family